The Rio Cobre is a river of Jamaica. Its source is unclear, the headwaters being a writhing of unnamed, seasonally dry tributaries. The highest of these rise just above the  contour. From here it flows to meet the Caribbean Sea in the north west corner of Kingston Harbour. It is dammed by the Rio Cobre Dam just above Spanish Town.

The river's most significant feature is perhaps the gorge through which it runs between Bog Walk and northern Spanish Town.

Bridges

There are a number of bridges over the Rio Cobre. The oldest is Flat Bridge, which was first built before 1774.

A second bridge, Iron Bridge was built in 1801. The proposal for this bridge first appeared in 1766 and the topic was discussed various bodies until 1796 the House of Assembly which originally resolved to erect a stone bridge. However technical difficulties led to an iron bridge being erected. This enabled the road to be raised above the surrounding terrain, something particularly important in the context of periodic floods in the rainy season. It used the same technology developed for The Iron Bridge in Shropshire, England, and indeed constituted the first application of this technology outside the United Kingdom. The iron components were pre-fabricated in West Yorkshire with a total weight of 87 tons. It took 43 horse-drawn wagons to transport these from the coast to the construction site. The bridge remained in use until 2000, when erosion by storm water put its future survival in jeopardy. However funds were raised for a restoration project which restored the bridge for use by 2010.

See also
List of rivers of Jamaica

References

General
 GEOnet Names Server
OMC Map
CIA Map
Ford, Jos C. and Finlay, A.A.C. (1908).The Handbook of Jamaica. Jamaica Government Printing Office

Inline

External links

Aerial view of mouth

Rivers of Jamaica
Cast-iron arch bridges